General Dalzell may refer to:

Robert Dalzell (British Army officer, born 1662) (1662–1758), British Army general of foot
Arthur Dalzell, 13th Earl of Carnwath (1851–1941), British Army brigadier general

See also
Henry Dalzell-Payne (1929–2018), British Army major general